Leonard "Leon" Lucas (September 4, 1901 – May 19, 1971) was an American boxer who competed in the 1928 Summer Olympics. He was born and died in Camden, New Jersey. In 1928 he was eliminated in the first round of the light heavyweight class after losing his fight to the upcoming silver medalist Ernst Pistulla.

1928 Olympic boxing
Below is the record of Leon Lucas, an American light heavyweight boxer who competed at the 1928 Amsterdam Olympics:

 Round of 16: lost to Ernst Pistulla (Germany) by decision

References
Leon Lucas' profile at Sports Reference.com

1901 births
1971 deaths
Sportspeople from Camden, New Jersey
Boxers from New Jersey
Light-heavyweight boxers
Olympic boxers of the United States
Boxers at the 1928 Summer Olympics
American male boxers